Chhimba are variously described as a caste community and a Sikh clan of India.

Their traditional occupation in the Samba district of India was dying and hand-printing calico fabric. It was probably some of these people who moved to areas of Himachal Pradesh, where they created a somewhat different style of printing cloth that was much favoured by the Gaddi people of the region.

</ref>

References 

Sikh communities
Social groups of Jammu and Kashmir
Social groups of Himachal Pradesh
Textile industry of India
Artisans